Johann Baptist Coronini-Cronberg (19 November 1794 – 26 July 1880) was an Austrian Feldzeugmeister born in Gorizia. Coronini-Cronberg was governor of the Voivodeship of Serbia and Banat of Temeschwar from 1851 to 1859. He was ban of Croatia from 28 July 1859 to 19 June 1860.

Occupation of the Danubian Principalities

General Coronini-Cronberg commanded the Austrian army which occupied the Danubian principalities of Wallachia and Moldavia in 1854, obliging Russian forces to withdraw. After a cursory investigation into 'the personal and official conduct' of the Russian-nominated hospodars, the princes Barbu Știrbei and Grigore Ghica, he ruled that they should be reinstated.

References

 

1794 births
1880 deaths
Bans of Croatia
Regents and governors of Wallachia
People of Serbian Vojvodina
Knights of the Golden Fleece of Austria
Austrian Empire military personnel of the Napoleonic Wars